The Willard House at 114 N. Main in Cottonwood, Arizona is a historic house built in 1890 for Mary Grace Willard, an early settler who arrived in 1888 and homesteaded the land upon which the house sits.  The house is unique as being built of brick and having Queen Anne style, at such an early time, and for a homestead house.

References

External links

National Register of Historic Places in Yavapai County, Arizona
Queen Anne architecture in Arizona
Houses completed in 1890
Houses in Yavapai County, Arizona
1890 establishments in Arizona Territory